Lievens is a Dutch patronymic surname ("Lieven's") most common in Belgium. People with this surname or patronym include:

Constant Lievens (1856–1893), Flemish Jesuit missionary in central India
 (1612–aft.1650), Dutch painter, brother of Jan Lievens 
Jan Lievens (1607–1674), Dutch painter, son of Lieven Hendricx 
Marc Lievens (born 1948), Belgian racing cyclist
Roeland Lievens (born 1983), Dutch rower

See also
Lieven, Baltic German noble family
Lieven (given name), Dutch masculine given name
Sint-Lievens-Houtem and Sint-Lievens-Esse, neighboring towns in East Flanders
Sint-Lievens-Merk, town in French Flanders

References

Dutch-language surnames
Patronymic surnames
Surnames of Belgian origin